= Navsegda! =

Studio album by Nichya
- Released: August 30, 2004
- Label: Sony BMG Russia

Nichya chronology
Navsegda! (2004)	Pora (2007)

Navsegda! (Cyrillic: НАВСЕГДА! Translated: Forever!) is the debut album from Russian group Nichya.

== Track listing ==
1. "Можно любить" (Mozhno Lyubit) (You Can Love)
2. "Снег" (Sneg) (Snow)
3. "Ничья" (Nichya) (No One's)
4. "Один-один" (Odin-Odin) (One to One)
5. "Никому, Никогда" (Nikomu, Nikoda) (For No one, Never)
6. "Ты где-то рядом " (Ty Gde-to Ryadom) (You're Somewhere Near)
7. "Всё время" (Vsyo Vremya) (All the Time)
8. "Начинай меня" (Nachinay Menya) (Begin with Me)
9. "Нет" (Niet) (No)
10. "Навсегда" (Navsegda)(Forever)
11. "Никому, Никогда"(Globass Club Mix)
12. "Ничья" (Globass Chillout Mix)
